Superman vol. 3 was an ongoing comic book series featuring the DC Comics  superhero of the same name. The second relaunch of the  main Superman title, following the cancellation of the second volume in 2011, it began publication as part of DC's The New 52, a company-wide relaunch initiative and  reboot following the Flashpoint limited series earlier that year, and the second full-on reboot following the 1986 maxiseries Crisis on Infinite Earths. It ran from 2011 to 2016, before being cancelled and relaunched as part of the DC Rebirth line.

Series Issues

Issues
Superman Vol 3

 Superman 1-52 (2012-2016)

Annuals
 Superman Annual #1 (2012)
 Superman Annual #2 (2013)
 Superman Annual #3 (2016)

Specials
 Superman: Future's End #1 (2014)

Collections
 Superman: What Price Tomorrow? (2012)
 Superman: H'el on Earth (2012)
 Superman: Krypton Returns (2013)
 Superman: Secrets & Lies (2013)
 Superman Unchained (2013)
 Superman: Fury at World's End (2014)
 Superman: Doomed (2014)
 Superman: Psi-War (2014)
 Superman: Under Fire (2015)
 Superman: The Men of Tomorrow (2015)
Superman: Truth (2015)
Superman: Savage Dawn (2016)
The Final Days of Superman (2016)

References